Jonah Hex is a 2010 American Western superhero film based on the DC Comics character of the same name. Directed by Jimmy Hayward in his live-action debut from a screenplay by Neveldine/Taylor, the film stars Josh Brolin in the title role, John Malkovich, Megan Fox, Michael Fassbender, Will Arnett, Michael Shannon and Wes Bentley.

Produced by Legendary Pictures, Andrew Lazar's Mad Chance Productions and Akiva Goldsman's Weed Road Pictures, the film was released on June 18, 2010, by Warner Bros. Pictures. It was a commercial failure, having grossed only $11 million against a budget of $47 million. It received generally negative reviews and has a 12% rating on Rotten Tomatoes.

Plot
Jonah Hex is a Confederate soldier who refuses an order from his commanding officer Quentin Turnbull to burn down a hospital.  Hex is forced to kill his best friend Jeb, Turnbull's son, who draws a pistol on Hex.  Turnbull later tracks Hex down at home and takes revenge for Jeb's death by killing Hex's family and branding Hex's face.  Hex is found near-death and healed by the Crow people; the experience leaves him with the ability to speak to the dead.  Turnbull fakes his death in a hotel fire and Hex, unable to seek revenge, becomes a bounty hunter.

In 1876, a gang of men led by Turnbull hijack a train carrying components of an experimental weapon invented by Eli Whitney.  President Grant realizes that Turnbull is planning to rebuild the weapon and use it attack the U.S. on the Fourth of July.  Grant instructs Army Lieutenant Grass to find Hex and hire him to track down and stop Turnbull.  Grass' men find Hex in a brothel with a prostitute named Lilah and inform him that Turnbull is still alive.

Hex travels to meet Grass at his encampment and uses his ability to interrogate a dead soldier.  The soldier tells Hex to find former Confederate Colonel Slocum, who now runs an illegal fighting pavilion in South Carolina.  Hex confronts Slocum, who refuses to reveal Turnbull's location and sarcastically suggests he ask his dead friend Jeb.  Hex throws Slocum to his death and burns the pavilion down.  He decides to travel to Gettysburg and dig up Jeb's body to ask him for help.  Jeb and Hex briefly fight before Jeb accepts Hex's apology for killing him.  He grudgingly reveals that his father is at Fort Resurrection.  Jeb also warns Hex to avoid death because many in the afterlife have plans for him.

Hex confronts Turnbull at the fort and kills several men before he is shot point blank in the chest.  Hex escapes by horse and travels back to find the Crow people.  Turnbull orders a man named Burke, who helped kill Hex's family, to track down something Hex loves and bring it to him.  While Hex is being healed again, Burke finds and kidnaps Lilah.  Turnbull assembles the weapon and conducts a test on a small town in Georgia, completely destroying it.

Hex sends a message to Lt. Grass with Turnbull's location and requests backup.  Hex travels to Independence Harbor and infiltrates Turnbull's ironclad warship.  He kills Burke, using his abilities to bring him back from the dead and incinerate him.  Turnbull holds Lilah at gunpoint and forces Hex to surrender. Hex and Lilah escape their holding cell as Lt. Grass arrives and attempts to arrest Turnbull.  Grass and his crew are destroyed by the weapon and Turnbull begins his attack on Washington, D.C.

Hex attacks Turnbull, as they fight Hex jams the weapon with a hatchet before locking Turnbull's neck in the machine.  Hex and Lilah escape the boat as the weapon backfires and explodes, killing Turnbull and all of his men.  The next day, President Grant gives Hex a large reward and a full pardon before offering him a job as Sheriff of the entire United States. Hex declines, but assures the president they can find him if they need him; he leaves the city with Lilah. The film ends with Hex visiting Jeb's grave to apologize for his father's death before riding off.

Cast
 Josh Brolin as Jonah Hex: A disfigured bounty hunter who is the film's antihero protagonist. Brolin initially hated the script, but changed his mind after growing to like its tongue-in-cheek tone.
 John Malkovich as Quentin Turnbull: The main antagonist who murdered Jonah Hex's family and disfigured the former.
 Megan Fox as Lilah Black: A gun-wielding prostitute and Jonah's love interest whose real name is Tallulah Black just like in the comics, but goes by Lilah for short and doesn't have scars on her body or a missing left eye unlike her comics counterpart.
 Michael Fassbender as Burke: A bowler hat-wearing, tattooed and psychopathic Irishman who is Turnbull's right-hand man. Fassbender likens his character to that of The Riddler and Malcolm McDowell's performance in A Clockwork Orange, saying he mainly found his character when he tried on the derby bowler.
 Will Arnett as Lieutenant Grass: A Union soldier who enlists Hex as a bounty hunter.
 Michael Shannon as Dr. Cross Williams: The ringleader of a gladiator circus. The studio planned to have Williams in a recurring character if a sequel surfaced.
 Wes Bentley as Adleman Lusk: A corrupt politician.
 Aidan Quinn as Ulysses S. Grant: The 18th President of the United States (Quinn was on set for only 3 days for this role).
 Lance Reddick as Smith: An armorer of sorts who supplies Hex with his new weapons.

The film also includes John Gallagher, Jr. as Lieutenant Evan, Tom Wopat as Colonel Slocum, and Julia Jones as Cassie; as well as an uncredited Jeffrey Dean Morgan as Jeb Turnbull. Mastodon guitarist/vocalist Brent Hinds also made a small cameo appearance.

Prior to Brolin's casting, actor Thomas Jane petitioned the studio for the role by hiring a makeup artist to give him the appearance of Jonah Hex. Jane instead voiced Hex in the 2010 animated short DC Showcase: Jonah Hex.

Production

In 2000, 20th Century Fox developed a one-hour television adaptation based on the character, with producers Akiva Goldsman and Robert Zappia involved, but the project never came to fruition. In July 2007, Warner Bros. held the film rights to the character and sought to make a film. Goldsman paired with Andrew Lazar as producers, and Mark Neveldine and Brian Taylor wrote the screenplay, which adapted an incarnation of the comic books that combined the Western genre with supernatural elements. In October 2008, Josh Brolin entered talks to be cast as Jonah Hex under the direction of Neveldine and Taylor. In November 2008, Neveldine and Taylors stepped down from being directors due to creative differences with the studio. The studio explored the possibility of hiring Andy Fickman or McG and by January 2009, it chose Jimmy Hayward (who previously directed Horton Hears a Who!) to direct Jonah Hex. By the following February, Brolin was set to star alongside John Malkovich, who was cast as the antagonist Quentin Turnbull. Filming began in Louisiana in April 2009.

Brolin would later admit that he hated the experience making the film stating that at one point they had to "[reshoot] 66 pages in 12 days", implying that the filming schedule was hectic. Director Francis Lawrence was brought in to supervise a number of reshoots.

Music

Heavy metal band Mastodon scored the film. Troy Sanders, bassist/vocalist of Mastodon, on their contribution to the film:

"Some of it was heavy, some of it was very moody. A lot of it was spacey, Melvins B-sides, Pink Floyd-like, surreal outer space, like Neil Young's Dead Man. Swirling, nausea music".
Sanders added that the collaboration felt natural: "Since day one, we've always written albums thinking the music was the score of a movie. Then we'll create the lyrics or storyline on top of that, as if we're writing the dialog to match the movie's cinematography".

The soundtrack is an hour-long instrumental, including five full songs and numerous smaller musical themes. Selections were added to scenes in the film by composer John Powell (Shrek, The Bourne Identity), and others were adapted for the London Orchestra for exceptionally epic moments. Sanders explained: "We wrote variations on themes for each character, different variables for a bunch of riffs: faster, slower, heavier, lighter. It's the Darth Vader approach".

Release

Theatrical

The film was released in the United States on June 18, 2010, the same day as Disney/Pixar's Toy Story 3.

Merchandise
 Tonner Doll Company, Inc. released in May 2010 Saloon Lilah as a doll.
 NECA has released an assortment of 3 action figures (Hex, Lilah, and Turnbull), and prop replicas from the film.
 WizKids has released a HeroClix Battle Pack consisting of Hex, Lilah, and Turnbull.
 DC Direct has released a Jonah Hex bust, a Lilah bust, and a 1:6 scale Jonah Hex Collector Figure.

Home media

The film was released on both DVD and Blu-ray on October 19, 2010, with some special features (DVD contains Deleted Scenes). It was then released in the United Kingdom on December 13, 2010, on DVD, Blu-ray and Double Play. Special features include Deleted Scenes, The Inside Story of Jonah Hex and a Picture-In-Picture Commentary.

Reception

Box office
Jonah Hex severely failed at the box office, opening at No. 7 during its debut weekend with only $5,379,365 in 2,825 theaters, averaging $1,904 per theater. On its second weekend, the film only managed to gross $1,627,442, falling to No. 10. The film ended its theatrical run on August 12, 2010, having grossed only $10,547,117 in total on a $47 million budget. Due to its negative domestic take, the film was not widely released internationally, grossing less than $500,000 outside the United States.

Critical response
The site's critical consensus reads, "Josh Brolin gives it his best shot, but he can't keep the short, unfocused Jonah Hex from collapsing on the screen." On Metacritic, the film has a score of 33 out of 100 based on 32 critics, indicating "generally unfavorable reviews". Audiences polled by CinemaScore gave the film an average grade of "C+" on an A+ to F scale.

Keith Phipps of The A.V. Club gave the film a rare "F" rating, stating "the 81 minutes (including credits) of Jonah Hex footage that made it to the screen look like something assembled under a tight deadline, and possibly under the influence." Roger Ebert gave the film a negative review, saying that the film "is based on some DC Comics characters, which may explain the way the plot jumps around. We hear a lot about graphic novels, but this is more of a graphic anthology of strange occult ideas."

Accolades
The film was named "Worst Picture" of the year by the Houston Film Critics Society at their 2010 awards ceremony. It was given two nominations at the 31st Golden Raspberry Awards: Worst Actress (Megan Fox) and Worst Screen Couple (Josh Brolin's face and Megan Fox's accent).

References

External links
 
 
 
 
 

2010 films
2010 fantasy films
2010 Western (genre) films
2010s fantasy action films
2010s superhero films
American Western (genre) fantasy films
American fantasy action films
American films about revenge
American superhero films
American vigilante films
Cultural depictions of Ulysses S. Grant
D-Box motion-enhanced films
2010s English-language films
Films directed by Jimmy Hayward
Films produced by Akiva Goldsman
Films based on DC Comics
Films scored by Marco Beltrami
Films set in the 1870s
Films shot in Louisiana
Jonah Hex
Legendary Pictures films
Live-action films based on DC Comics
Resurrection in film
Warner Bros. films
2010s American films
2010s vigilante films